Salqin is a town in Syria, administratively part of Idlib Governorate. Nearby localities include Kafr Takharim to the southeast, Abu Talha to the south, Delbiya to the southwest, al-Alani to the northwest and Isqat to the northeast. Salqin is the center of its nahiya (subdistrict). It had a population of 23,700 in 2004. Its inhabitants are predominantly Sunni Muslims, although there is also a small Alawite community.

The town is situated in the southern Orontes River valley and has an altitude of 460 meters above sea level. Olive and other fruit trees surround Salqin. It exports produce from these orchards as well as vegetables. Agriculture is sustained by the large number of springs in Salqin.

History
According to legends, the city was the summer residence of Seleucus I, hence the naming. An inscription, found on a stone between two cypress trees in the village, dates its foundation to 98 BC.

Salqin was mentioned by medieval Muslim historian Izz al-Din ibn Shaddad al-Halabi as the site of one of 22 abandoned or ruined fortresses in the Aleppo region, likely disbanded or destroyed during the Mongol invasions of Syria in the mid to late 13th century. The Mamluks who gained power in the region at that time did not rebuild the fortress in Salqin.

A former education minister and two former governors of Homs and Raqqah were from Salqin. In November 2012, during the Syrian civil war, Syrian rebels captured the town from government forces. According to anti-government activists, around 70% of Salqin's residents still supported the government of Bashar al-Assad in January 2013. This led to tensions, and the killing of a number of pro-Assad activists.

Climate

Notable people 

 Dima Aktaa - activist and parathlete

References

Bibliography

Towns in Syria
Populated places in Harem District